Amicable Society for a Perpetual Assurance Office (a.k.a. "Amicable Society") is considered the first life insurance company in the world.

References

Sources 
Amicable Society, The charters, acts of Parliament, and by-laws of the corporation of the Amicable Society for a perpetual assurance office, Gilbert and Rivington, 1854
Anzovin, Steven, Famous First Facts 2000, item # 2422, H. W. Wilson Company, 
Baynes, Thomas Spencer, The Encyclopædia Britannica: a dictionary of arts, sciences, and general literature, Volume 13, H.G. Allen, 1888
Price, Richard, Observations on reversionary payments: on schemes for providing annuities for widows, and for persons in old age; on the method of calculating the values of assurances on lives; and on the national debt, T. Cadell & W. Davies, 1812

 
1706 establishments in England
Financial services companies established in 1706
History of insurance